Steppenwolf may refer to:

Biology
 Steppe wolf (Steppenwolf in German), a canine subspecies indigenous to Central Asia

Arts and media

Music
 Steppenwolf (band), a Canadian-American rock band from the 1960s
 "Steppenwolf", a song by Hawkwind from Astounding Sounds, Amazing Music
 "He Was a Steppenwolf", a song by Boney M. from Nightflight to Venus

Albums
 Steppenwolf (Steppenwolf album), 1968
 Steppenwolf Live, 1970
 Steppenwolf 7, an album by Steppenwolf, 1970
 Steppenwolf (Peter Maffay album), 1979
 Steppenwolf (World Saxophone Quartet album), 2002

Other uses in arts and media
 Steppenwolf (novel), by Hermann Hesse, 1927
 Steppenwolf (film), a 1974 adaptation of Hesse's novel
 Steppenwolf (character), a villain in the DC Comics Universe
 Steppenwolf Theatre Company, a theater company in Chicago, Illinois
 Steppenwolfs, a faction in the video game Crossout

Other uses
 Audi Steppenwolf, an Audi concept car

See also

 Steppe (disambiguation)